Rome Hill, also called St. Davids Hill, is a small summit at the southeast corner of Lake Elsinore.

References

Mountains of Riverside County, California